USCGC Liberty (WPB-1334) is an Island-class cutter of the United States Coast Guard. She spent her first 33 years of service homeported in Juneau, Alaska where she patrolled territorial waters, including the Inside Passage. In 2016 she won the Hopley Yeaton Cutter Excellence Award for outstanding operational and humanitarian achievements.  In 2022 she was reassigned to Valdez, Alaska.

Design and characteristics

The Island-class patrol boats, including Liberty, were constructed in Bollinger Shipyards, Lockport, Louisiana. Their design is based on the British Vosper Thornycroft  patrol boats and have similar dimensions. The patrol boat has a displacement of 155 tons at full load and 138 tons at half load. 

The Coast Guard purchased 49 Island-class cutters, and over the course of their construction made several modifications.  The ships are grouped into A, B, and C classes depending on their design.  Liberty is a B-class ship and thus has heavier bow plating to prevent hull cracking in heavy seas, among other enhancements.

Liberty is powered two Paxman Valenta 16 CM Diesel engines which drive two 5-blade propellers. She has two  Caterpillar 3304T diesel generators for electrical power. Her hull is constructed from high-strength steel, and her superstructure and main deck are constructed from aluminium.  Stern flaps were retrofitted to reduce hull friction and increase speed and full efficiency.  Liberty has active fin stabilizers to improve her seakeeping characteristics.

They are fitted with one 25mm machine gun and two Browning .50 Caliber Machine Gun. They are equipped with satellite navigation systems, collision avoidance systems, and surface radar.

Liberty carries one 18-foot rigid hull inflatable boat with seating for 8 crew.

Liberty's complement is 2 officers and 16 enlisted crew.

Liberty's namesake is Liberty Island in New York Harbor, site of the Statue of Liberty.

Operational history
Liberty was commissioned on December 18, 1989.  She was the 34th of the Island-class cutters.  Her original cost was reported as $6.5 million.  After commissioning, she was assigned to Juneau, where she moored at Auke Bay.  She replaced USCGC Cape Carter at this station.

Her primary missions are law enforcement, fisheries management, search and rescue, and oil spill response.  She is credited, along with Alaska State Troopers, with the largest hash oil seizure in Alaska history.  On October 30, 2007 crew from Liberty boarded the fishing vessel 819 in the Ketchikan area.  They found five half-pint jars of the drug with a street value between $40,000 and $50,000.

The United States and Canada disagree on the location of the maritime border in Dixon Entrance.  This led to a series of seizures of Canadian fishing boats by Liberty in the disputed waters.  Diane S. was fishing 400 yards into U.S. waters when she was seized on July 20, 1991.  Eliza Joye was seized on July 29, 1991.. Serene was seized 875 yards north of the border claimed by the U.S. on July 20, 1992.  A 1990 agreement between the two countries reduced fishing conflicts and Liberty's seizures of Canadian boats when it became effective in 1992.  While the conflict with Canada has faded, Liberty continues to board U.S.-flagged fishing boats to enforce fishing and safety regulations.  In the summer of 2018, for instance, Liberty's boardings found five vessels in violation of various regulations.

Liberty has been involved in many search and rescue missions.  Often they consist of assisting fishing vessels with mechanical problems.  For example, in September 2001 Liberty rescued five crewmen from the fishing vessel Baranof Queen which had been disabled off Cape Spencer.  In other instances, the distressed vessel was wrecked.  After the  salmon-fishing vessel Belle-Tech was wrecked on the Gilanta Rocks in Dixon Entrance on July 19, 1999, Liberty rescued her crew of two, which had abandoned ship in a small boat.  Liberty took eight people off the beached charter yacht Alaskan Song in 2001.
Sometimes her searches were for a single person in a canoe.  On a few occasions, however, Liberty was dispatched on rescue missions involving dozens or hundreds of people.  At approximately 12:35 am on May 15, 2007 the sternwheel cruise ship Empress of the North went aground on Hanus Reef at the eastern entrance of Icy Strait. She had 281 passengers and crew aboard.  While her outer hull was pierced by a rock, the inner hull was intact and pumps were able to keep up with the flooding.  Liberty, the ferry Columbia, and a number of nearby fishing boats responded.  Liberty took off about 130 passengers and transferred them to Columbia.  Private vessels evacuated the remaining passengers and most were transferred to the ferry.  All the passengers were off the stricken vessel by about 5:30 am.  Columbia arrived in Juneau at 11 am with the passengers while Liberty remained with Empress of the North.  The grounded ship was able to refloat and make its way to Auke Bay under its own power, escorted by Liberty.

In July 2008 Liberty responded to another grounded cruise ship, Spirit of Glacier Bay.  She ran onto a sand bar at the head of Tarr Inlet in Glacier Bay National Park.  Her passengers were evacuated by park vessels before Liberty arrived.  When the high tide refloated the cruise liner, Liberty escorted her to port in case further assistance was required.  Liberty had assisted another disabled cruise liner, Spirit of Columbia, owned by the same company, Cruise West,  as Spirit of Glacier Bay, just two months before.

Liberty has been awarded the meritorious unit commendation.

Replacement plans 
As early as the mid-2000s the mechanical reliability of the aging Island-class ships became an issue.  The Coast Guard began retiring Island-class cutters in 2012, replacing them with Sentinel-class fast-response cutters.  In 2018 Juneau city officials believed that Liberty would be decommissioned in 2023 and advocated with the Coast Guard that Liberty should be replaced by a fast response cutter home-ported at Auke Bay.  In reply to an inquiry from a U.S. Senator in April 2018, the commandant of the Coast Guard indicated that the service planned to replace Liberty with a coastal patrol boat rather than a fast response cutter. Indeed, that is exactly what happened in 2022 when USCGC Reef Shark, a Marine Protector-class patrol boat, was assigned to Juneau.  Liberty was reassigned to Valdez, Alaska.

References

Ships of the United States Coast Guard
Island-class patrol boats
Juneau, Alaska
Ships built in Lockport, Louisiana
1989 ships